The 1958 UCLA Bruins football team was an American football team that represented the University of California, Los Angeles in the Pacific Coast Conference during the 1958 NCAA University Division football season.  In their first year under head coaches George W. Dickerson (three games) and then Bill Barnes (seven games), the Bruins compiled a 3–6–1 record (2–4–1 in PCC, sixth).

UCLA's offensive leaders in 1958 were quarterback Don Long with 395 passing yards, Ray Smith with 307 rushing yards, and John Brown with 259 receiving yards.

Five weeks before the first game, head coach Red Sanders died of a heart attack at age 53 in a Los Angeles hotel room. Dickerson was promoted to head coach several days later, but after two hospitalizations for nervous exhaustion, Barnes was named head coach prior to the fourth game, and remained through the 1964 season.

Schedule

Personnel

Players
 Glen Almquist, end, junior
 Harry Baldwin, center, sophomore
 Ray Benstead, center, senior
 Dean Betts, tackle
 John Brown, receiver, senior
 Dick Butler, center, senior
 Rod Cochran, guard
 John Davis, wingback
 Rod Fagerholm, tackle
 Gene Gaines, fullback
 Steve Gertsman, quarterback
 Joe Harper, guard
 Jim Johnson, receiver
 Chuck Kendall, tailback
 Billy Kilmer, tailback, sophomore
 Bob King, guard, senior
 Bill Leeka, guard, senior
 Don Long, tailback, senior
 Tony Longo, tackle
 Marv Luster, end, sophomore
 Jack Metcalf, guard, sophomore
 Trusse Norris, lineman
 Paul Oglesby, tackle, junior
 Phil Parslow, wingback, senior
 Dave Peterson, quarterback
 Art Phillips, junior
 John Pierovich, end
 Mike Riskas, guard, senior
 Ray Smith, fullback, junior
 "Skip" Smith, tailback, junior
 Jim Steffen, tailback
 Ben Treat, center, sophomore
 Jim Wallace, defensive tackle
 Dick Wallen, end
 Clint Whitfield, guard
 Kirk Wilson, punter

Coaching staff
 George W. Dickerson - head coach
 Bill Barnes - acting head coach following death of Red Sanders
 Assistant coaches - John Johnson, Bob Bergdahl (frosh coach), Deke Brackett, Sam Boghosian, and Dan Peterson

Other personnel
 Trainer - Ducky Drake
 Assistant trainer - Larry Carter
 Team physician - Dr. Martin Blazina
 Varsity football managers - Tom Naykama, Bob Nishimura, Peter Dalis (senior manager), Perry Gluckman, Tony Giovanazzo, Larry Kasindorf

References

UCLA
UCLA Bruins football seasons
UCLA Bruins football
UCLA Bruins football